Vedanta Press is the publishing wing of the Vedanta Society of Southern California, founded in 1930 by Swami Prabhavananda. It publishes a number of important books in Indian philosophy and the Vedanta tradition, both original works and translations of Sanskrit scriptures. Vedanta Press published the bimonthly Vedanta for the West from 1941 to 1970. From 1951 to 1962, Aldous Huxley, Christopher Isherwood, and Gerald Heard were editorial advisors for the journal. Karl Jackson in his book, Vedanta for the West said, "The journal is arguably the best edited Eastern spiritual periodical published in the West..." After its establishment in the late 1940s, Publishers Weekly reported that "Vedanta Press, the recently established Hollywood firm.... has received considerable publicity in articles appearing in Time, Life, Holiday, and Vogue." It also noted that
Vedanta Press... plans six titles for its first list of books about the Vedanta philosophy, which is currently reflected in the writings of Aldous Huxley, Christopher Isherwood, and others. [These are] the "Wisdom of God," "The Eternal Companion," "Vedanta— Its Philosophy," and "What is Vedanta?" [and translations of] "Crest-Jewel of Discrimination,"... and... the "Upanishads"

Main Titles

 Spiritual Heritage of India (see article) by Swami Prabhavananda
 The Eternal Companion: Brahmananda, his Life and Teachings
 How to Know God: The Yoga Aphorisms of Patanjali
 Ramakrishna and his Disciples
 Vedanta for the Western World
 Vedanta for Modern Man
 Living Wisdom: Vedanta in the West
 Upanishads: Breath of the Eternal
 Bhagavad Gita: The Song of God
 Vedanta: A Simple Introduction
 Sermon on the Mount according to Vedanta
 Shankara's Crest-jewel of Discrimination
 Narada's Way of Divine Love: The Narada Bhakti Sutras
 Vedanta: A Religion, a Philosophy, a Way of Life
 Seeing God Everywhere: A Practical Guide to Spiritual Living
 Six Lighted Windows: Memories of Swamis in the West

References

External links
 Vedanta Press Website

Book publishing companies based in California